Beat Albrecht von Ramstein (1594–1651) was the Prince-Bishop of Basel from 1646 to 1651.

Biography

Beat Albrecht von Ramstein was born in Waldighofen on 14 July 1594.

On 29 November 1646 the cathedral chapter of the Basel Münster elected him as Prince-Bishop of Basel.  He was ordained as a priest in 1647.  Pope Innocent X confirmed his appointment as Bishop of Basel on 22 August 1650, and he was subsequently consecrated as a bishop by Thomas Henrici, auxiliary bishop of Basel on 1 May 1651.

He died on 25 August 1651.

References

1594 births
1651 deaths
Prince-Bishops of Basel